Nanabe Creek is a stream in the U.S. state of Mississippi. It is a tributary to Sowashee Creek.

Nanabe is a name derived from the Choctaw language purported to mean "fish trap".

References

Rivers of Mississippi
Rivers of Lauderdale County, Mississippi
Mississippi placenames of Native American origin